The Prabu Geusan Ulun Museum is a museum located in Sumedang on  West Java, Indonesia. It is located on Geusan Ulun Road 40B.

The museum houses a collection of traditional Sundanese weaponry, as well as the crown jewels and other finery.

Literature

External links 
 Java Tourism | Museum Prabu Geusan Ulun

Museums in West Java
History museums in Indonesia